Mike Darby (19 June 1942 – 3 March 2012) was an  Australian rules footballer who played with North Melbourne in the Victorian Football League (VFL).

Notes

External links 

1942 births
2012 deaths
Australian rules footballers from Victoria (Australia)
North Melbourne Football Club players